Scientist Meets the Space Invaders is a 1981 album by the dub musician Scientist.

The album was produced by Mickie "Roots" Scott and Linval Thompson. The recording was done at Channel One Studios backed by the Roots Radics, and mixed at King Tubby's. The recording was by Stanley "Barnabas" Bryan, Anthony "Crucial Bunny" Graham and Maxwell "Maxie" McKenzie. The cover artwork is by Tony McDermott.

The tracks that formed the basis of the album were Thompson productions including Wayne Wade's "Poor and Humble" ("Cloning Process"), and Johnny Osbourne's "Kiss Somebody" ("Quasar").

Critical reception 
Reviewing for AllMusic, Stephen Cook regarded the album as a "great dub" record and among Scientist's "essential" albums. Fellow critic Tom Hull called it "one of the more legendary" recordings in which Scientist "orchestrated dozens of mythic battles, encounters, and jams ... although it feels like something he could do dozens of times."

Track listing
All tracks composed by Linval Thompson
Side one - First Wall
"Beam Down" - 3:20
"Red Shift" - 3:33
"Time Warp" - 2:51
"Cloning Process" - 4:16
"Pulsar" - 3:10
Side two - Second Wall
"Laser Attack" - 3:45
"Dematerialise" - 2:48
"Fission" - 2:35
"Super Nova Explosion" - 2:34
"Quasar" - 2:58

Personnel
 Carlton "Santa" Davis, Lincoln "Style" Scott - drums
 Errol "Flabba" Holt - bass
 Noel "Sowell" Bailey, Eric "Bingy Bunny" Lamont - guitar
 Wycliffe "Steelie" Johnson, Winston Wright - organ
 Gladstone "Gladdy" Anderson - piano
 Christopher "Sky Juice" Blake, Noel "Skully" Simms - percussion
Technical
Scientist - mixing
Stanley "Barnabas" Bryan, Anthony "Crucial Bunny" Graham, Lancelot "Maxie" McKenzie - recording
Tony McDermott - cover artwork

References

Scientist (musician) albums
1981 albums
Dub albums
Greensleeves Records albums